Betty Blue is a 1986 French erotic psychological drama film directed by Jean-Jacques Beineix, based on the 1985 novel 37°2 le matin by Philippe Djian. The film stars Béatrice Dalle and Jean-Hugues Anglade. It was the eighth highest-grossing film of 1986 in France.

The film received both a BAFTA and Oscar nomination for Best Foreign Language Film in 1986.

Plot
Zorg is a thirty-something aspiring writer making a living as a handyman for a community of beach houses in the seaside resort at Gruissan on France's Mediterranean coast. He meets 19-year-old Betty, a volatile and impulsive young woman, and the two begin a passionate affair, living in his borrowed shack on the beach. Following a row with him where she tears apart and smashes up the house, she finds the manuscript of his first novel; she reads it in one long sitting and decides that he is a genius. However, after another argument with his boss, she empties the shack and burns it down. The two decamp to the outskirts of Paris, where her friend Lisa has a small hotel. Betty laboriously types out Zorg's novel and submits it to various publishers. They meet Lisa's new boyfriend Eddy, and the four have many fun times, often fuelled by alcohol. They find work in Eddy's pizzeria, but a fight erupts in which Betty stabs a customer with a fork. Zorg tries to slap her back to her senses.

Though Zorg hides the rejection letters, Betty finds one and, going to the publisher's house, slashes his face. Zorg induces him to drop charges by threatening him with violence, saying that she is the only good thing in his life and she is all he has. Eddy's mother dies and the friends go to the funeral in Marvejols. There, Eddy asks Zorg and Betty if they will live in the dead woman's house and look after her piano shop. Zorg enjoys the quiet provincial life and makes friends with the grocer Bob, his sex-starved wife Annie, and various offbeat characters, but Betty's violent mood swings are a concern. One day, after an irritating comment from Zorg, she punches out a window with her bare hand and goes on a screaming flight through the town. Happiness seems on the horizon when a home test suggests that Betty is pregnant, but a lab test is negative and she sinks into depression and tells him that she is hearing voices talking to her in her head. Zorg, masquerading as a woman, robs an armoured cash collection van delivery headquarters, holding the guards at gunpoint, and tying them up. He attempts to use the money to buy Betty's happiness, but she fails to respond and enacts yet another prosecutable offence by luring a small boy away from his mother and taking him to a toy store. Zorg finds her and they both flee from the authorities as they rush to rescue the boy.

One day, Zorg comes home to find blood all over the place and Betty gone. Bob tells him she has gouged out an eye and is in the hospital. Rushing there, Zorg finds her under heavy sedation and is told to come back the next day. Going home, he receives a phone call from a publisher accepting his manuscript. On his next visit to the hospital, he finds Betty restrained and catatonic. He becomes agitated and a doctor tells him that she will need prolonged treatment and may never recover her sanity. Zorg reacts by blaming her illness on the medication being administered and physically attacks the doctor. He is forcefully ejected from the hospital after a violent struggle with three orderlies. Returning in disguise, he whispers his farewells and smothers Betty with a pillow. Going home, he sits down to continue his current novel, while conversing with his adopted cat, from whom he hears Betty's disembodied voice.

Cast

Production
According to the director Jean-Jacques Beineix, the relationship between Jean-Hugues Anglade and Béatrice Dalle went far beyond a simple professional collaboration. "They were flirting all the time. It's clear that we didn't know if we were in the movie anymore. They lived an extraordinary story."

Release
Betty Blue was distributed in the UK and the US in November 1986 with English subtitles.

A 185-minute director's cut debuted in 2000 with the extra hour allowing Betty's descent into madness to take up more space and her pursuit of motherhood to get more screen time. Zorg's character is explored with several solo vignettes, including his cross-dressing crime spree.

Both the 185-minute Director’s Cut and the original theatrical cut were released on blu-ray in 2013 by Second Sight Films. The director's cut was added to The Criterion Collection on DVD and Blu-ray on 19 November 2019.

Reception

Betty Blue received mostly positive reviews from critics. The film holds a 78% rating on Rotten Tomatoes based on twenty-seven reviews.

See also

 List of submissions to the 59th Academy Awards for Best Foreign Language Film
 List of French submissions for the Academy Award for Best Foreign Language Film
 Cinéma du look

References

External links
 
 
 
 
Betty Blue: The Look of Love an essay by Chelsea Phillips-Carr at the Criterion Collection

1986 films
1986 romantic drama films
1980s erotic drama films
1980s French-language films
1980s psychological drama films
Erotic romance films
Films about self-harm
Films based on French novels
Films directed by Jean-Jacques Beineix
Films scored by Gabriel Yared
Films set in Marseille
French erotic drama films
French psychological drama films
French romantic drama films
Gaumont Film Company films
Murder in films
1980s French films